Olav Kyrres plass is a square and area in Frogner in Oslo, Norway. The area centered on the intersection between Drammensveien and Bygdøy allé. It is named for King Olav Kyrre.

References

Squares in Oslo